This article describes all the 2017 seasons of Formula Renault series around the world.

Formula Renault 2.0L

2017 Formula Renault Eurocup season

2017 Formula Renault Northern European Cup season

2017 Asian Formula Renault Series season

Formula Renault 1.6L

2017 French F4 Championship season

Unofficial Formula Renault championships

2017 World Series Formula V8 3.5

2017 Formula STCC Nordic season

2017 Formula STCC NEZ season

2017 V de V Challenge Monoplace

2017 Remus Formula Renault 2.0 Pokal season

The season was held between 7 April and 8 October and raced across Austria, Italy, Czech Republic and Germany. The races occur with other categories cars as part of the 2017 Austria Formula 3 Cup, this section presents only the Austrian Formula Renault 2.0L classification.

2017 Formula Renault 2.0 Argentina season
All cars use Tito 02 chassis, all races were held in Argentina.

1 extra point in each race for regularly qualified drivers.

FIA Formula 4 powered by Renault

Formula 4 South East Asia Championship

2017 F4 Danish Championship

References 

Renault
Formula Renault seasons